Dragan Momić (born 28 November 1963) is a Serbian former handball player.

Club career
Momić started out at his hometown club Vrbas. He moved abroad to Liga ASOBAL team Juventud Alcalá in 1992. After a year in Spain, Momić returned to his homeland and agreed terms with Partizan. He helped them win the domestic double in the 1993–94 season.

After spending several seasons with his parent club Vrbas in the mid-to-late 1990s, Momić rejoined Partizan and appeared in the 1999–2000 EHF Champions League.

International career
At international level, Momić competed for FR Yugoslavia in two major tournaments, winning the bronze medal at the 1996 European Championship.

Honours
Partizan
 Handball Championship of FR Yugoslavia: 1993–94
 Handball Cup of FR Yugoslavia: 1993–94

References

External links
 

1963 births
Living people
People from Vrbas, Serbia
Yugoslav male handball players
Serbia and Montenegro male handball players
Serbian male handball players
RK Vrbas players
RK Partizan players
Liga ASOBAL players
Expatriate handball players
Serbia and Montenegro expatriate sportspeople in Spain